The Miss Florida World competition is a beauty pageant that selects the representative for the state of Florida in the Miss World America pageant.

The current Miss Florida World is Jasity Rush of Gainesville.

Winners 
Color key

Notes to table

References

External links

Florida culture
Women in Florida
1951 establishments in Florida
Recurring events established in 1951